George Crenshaw may refer to:

 George Crenshaw (racing driver), former NASCAR driver
 George L. Crenshaw, banker and developer
 George Webster Crenshaw, cartoonist and creator of the comic strip Belvedere